In mathematics, real projective space, denoted  or  is the topological space of lines passing through the origin 0 in  It is a compact, smooth manifold of dimension , and is a special case  of a Grassmannian space.

Basic properties

Construction
As with all projective spaces, RPn is formed by taking the quotient of  under the equivalence relation  for all real numbers . For all x in  one can always find a λ such that λx has norm 1. There are precisely two such λ differing by sign.

Thus RPn can also be formed by identifying antipodal points of the unit n-sphere, Sn, in Rn+1.

One can further restrict to the upper hemisphere of Sn and merely identify antipodal points on the bounding equator. This shows that RPn is also equivalent to the closed n-dimensional disk, Dn, with antipodal points on the boundary, identified.

Low-dimensional examples
 RP1 is called the real projective line, which is topologically equivalent to a circle.
 RP2 is called the real projective plane. This space cannot be embedded in R3. It can however be embedded in R4 and can be immersed in R3 (see here). The questions of embeddability and immersibility for projective n-space have been well-studied.
 RP3 is (diffeomorphic to) SO(3), hence admits a group structure; the covering map S3 → RP3 is a map of groups Spin(3) → SO(3), where Spin(3) is a Lie group that is the universal cover of SO(3).

Topology
The antipodal map on the n-sphere (the map sending x to −x) generates a Z2 group action on Sn. As mentioned above, the orbit space for this action is RPn. This action is actually a covering space action giving Sn as a double cover of RPn. Since Sn is simply connected for n ≥ 2, it also serves as the universal cover in these cases. It follows that the fundamental group of RPn is Z2 when n > 1. (When n = 1 the fundamental group is Z due to the homeomorphism with S1). A generator for the fundamental group is the closed curve obtained by projecting any curve connecting antipodal points in Sn down to RPn.

The projective n-space is compact, connected, and has a fundamental group isomorphic to the cyclic group of order 2: its universal covering space is given by the antipody quotient map from the n-sphere, a simply connected space. It is a double cover. The antipode map on Rp has sign , so it is orientation-preserving if and only if p is even.

The projective n-space is in fact diffeomorphic to the submanifold of R(n+1)2 consisting of all symmetric  matrices of trace 1 that are also idempotent linear transformations.

Geometry of real projective spaces
Real projective space admits a constant positive scalar curvature metric, coming from the double cover by the standard round sphere (the antipodal map is locally an isometry).

For the standard round metric, this has sectional curvature identically 1.

In the standard round metric, the measure of projective space is exactly half the measure of the sphere.

Smooth structure
Real projective spaces are smooth manifolds. On Sn, in homogeneous coordinates, (x1, ..., xn+1), consider the subset Ui with xi ≠ 0. Each Ui is homeomorphic to the disjoint union of two open unit balls in Rn that map to the same subset of RPn and the coordinate transition functions are smooth. This gives RPn a smooth structure.

Structure as a CW complex 
Real projective space RPn admits the structure of a CW complex with 1 cell in every dimension. 

In homogeneous coordinates (x1 ... xn+1) on Sn, the coordinate neighborhood U1 = {(x1 ... xn+1) | x1 ≠ 0} can be identified with the interior of n-disk  Dn. When xi = 0, one has RPn−1. Therefore the n−1 skeleton of RPn is RPn−1, and the attaching map f : Sn−1 → RPn−1 is the 2-to-1 covering map. One can put

Induction shows that RPn is a CW complex with 1 cell in every dimension up to n. 

The cells are Schubert cells, as on the flag manifold. That is, take a complete flag (say the standard flag) 0 = V0 < V1 <...< Vn; then the closed k-cell is lines that lie in Vk.

In homogeneous coordinates (with respect to the flag), the cells are

This is not a regular CW structure, as the attaching maps are 2-to-1. However, its cover is a regular CW structure on the sphere, with 2 cells in every dimension; indeed, the minimal regular CW structure on the sphere.

In light of the smooth structure, the existence of a Morse function would show RPn is a CW complex. One such function is given by, in homogeneous coordinates,

On each neighborhood Ui, g has nondegenerate critical point (0,...,1,...,0) where 1 occurs in the i-th position with Morse index i. This shows RPn is a CW complex with 1 cell in every dimension.

Tautological bundles
Real projective space has a natural line bundle over it, called the tautological bundle. More precisely, this is called the tautological subbundle, and there is also a dual n-dimensional bundle called the tautological quotient bundle.

Algebraic topology of real projective spaces

Homotopy groups
The higher homotopy groups of RPn are exactly the higher homotopy groups of Sn, via the long exact sequence on homotopy associated to a fibration.

Explicitly, the fiber bundle is: 
You might also write this as 

The homotopy groups are:

Homology
The cellular chain complex associated to the above CW structure has 1 cell in each dimension 0, ..., n. For each dimensional k, the boundary maps dk : δDk → RPk−1/RPk−2 is the map that collapses the equator on Sk−1 and then identifies antipodal points. In odd (resp. even) dimensions, this has degree 0 (resp. 2): 

Thus the integral homology is

RPn is orientable if and only if n is odd, as the above homology calculation shows.

Infinite real projective space
The infinite real projective space is constructed as the direct limit or union of the finite projective spaces:

This space is classifying space of O(1), the first orthogonal group.

The double cover of this space is the infinite sphere , which is contractible. The infinite projective space is therefore the Eilenberg–MacLane space K(Z2, 1).  

For each nonnegative integer q, the modulo 2 homology group .  

Its cohomology ring modulo 2 is 

See also
Complex projective space
Quaternionic projective space
Lens space
Real projective plane

Notes

References
 Bredon, Glen. Topology and geometry, Graduate Texts in Mathematics, Springer Verlag 1993, 1996
 
 

Algebraic topology
Differential geometry
Projective geometry